The Edinburgh Football League was formed in 1894 in Scotland as one of several supplementary football leagues that were created in order to increase the number of fixtures for Scottish Football League clubs. It changed its name to the East of Scotland Football League in 1896 when Dundee joined.

In 1899 some of its clubs also entered the Inter City League along with former Glasgow League clubs. The East of Scotland League eventually disbanded in 1908 and has no connection to the present day East of Scotland Football League. A 'North-Eastern Cup' was organised in place of the league, which ran until 1914.

Member clubs
Membership included Aberdeen, Dundee, East Stirlingshire, Falkirk, Heart of Midlothian, Hibernian, Leith Athletic, Raith Rovers and St Bernard's. The league champions were awarded the McRae Cup.

Champions
1894–95 Heart of Midlothian
1895–96 Heart of Midlothian
1896–97 Heart of Midlothian
1897–98 Heart of Midlothian
1898–99 Heart of Midlothian
1899–1900 Heart of Midlothian
1900–01 Dundee
1901–02 Hibernian
1902–03 Dundee
1903–04 Heart of Midlothian
1904–05 Falkirk
1905–06 Aberdeen
1906–07 Dundee
1907–08 Unfinished

North-Eastern Cup
1908–09 Dundee
1909–10 Heart of Midlothian
1910–11 Hibernian
1911–12 Falkirk
1912–13 Heart of Midlothian
1913–14 Aberdeen

See also
List of defunct football leagues in Scotland

References

Defunct football leagues in Scotland
Edinburgh football competitions
1894 establishments in Scotland
Sports leagues established in 1894
Sports leagues disestablished in 1908
1908 disestablishments in Scotland

he:ליגות כדורגל מוספות#ליגת הכדורגל של אדינבורו